The McIlwraith bar-lipped skink (Glaphyromorphus nyanchupinta)  is a species of skink found in Queensland in Australia.

References

Glaphyromorphus
Reptiles described in 2014
Taxa named by Conrad J. Hoskin
Taxa named by Patrick J. Couper